The moths of Zimbabwe represent about 1,000 known moth species. The moths (mostly nocturnal) and butterflies (mostly diurnal) together make up the taxonomic order Lepidoptera.

This is a list of moth species which have been recorded in Zimbabwe.

Adelidae
Ceromitia phaeocoma Meyrick, 1912
Ceromitia pilularis Meyrick, 1921
Ceromitia synneura Meyrick, 1921

Alucitidae
Alucita compsoxantha (Meyrick, 1924)
Alucita homotrocha (Meyrick, 1921)
Microschismus lenzi Ustjuzhanin & Kovtunovich, 2011

Anomoeotidae
Staphylinochrous euryperalis Hampson, 1910
Thermochrous stenocraspis Hampson, 1910

Arctiidae
Acantharctia flavicosta (Hampson, 1900)
Afrasura indecisa (Walker, 1869)
Afrospilarctia lucida (Druce, 1898)
Alpenus investigatorum (Karsch, 1898)
Alpenus maculosa (Stoll, 1781)
Alpenus nigropunctata (Bethune-Baker, 1908)
Amata atricornis (Wallengren, 1863)
Amata croceizona (Hampson, 1910)
Amata endocrocis (Hampson, 1903)
Amata marina (Butler, 1876)
Amata miozona (Hampson, 1910)
Amerila affinis (Rothschild, 1910)
Amerila bubo (Walker, 1855)
Amerila lupia (Druce, 1887)
Amerila mulleri Häuser & Boppré, 1997
Amsacta grammiphlebia Hampson, 1901
Anaphosia astrigata Hampson, 1910
Anaphosia cyanogramma Hampson, 1903
Apisa grisescens (Dufrane, 1945)
Boadicea flavimacula Pinhey, 1968
Caripodia chrysargyria Hampson, 1900
Ceryx nacliodes Hampson, 1914
Cyana pretoriae (Distant, 1897)
Eilema elegans (Butler, 1877)
Eilema sanguicosta (Hampson, 1901)
Eilema similipuncta Hampson, 1914
Epitoxis nigra Hampson, 1903
Estigmene tenuistrigata (Hampson, 1900)
Eyralpenus scioana (Oberthür, 1880)
Lepista aposema Kühne, 2010
Macrosia chalybeata Hampson, 1901
Metarctia collocalia Kiriakoff, 1957
Metarctia crocina (Kiriakoff, 1973)
Metarctia flavivena Hampson, 1901
Metarctia quinta (Kiriakoff, 1973)
Metarctia tenera (Kiriakoff, 1973)
Micralarctia punctulatum (Wallengren, 1860)
Ochrota unicolor (Hopffer, 1857)
Paralacydes bomfordi (Pinhey, 1968)
Paralacydes destrictus Kühne, 2010
Paralacydes ramosa (Hampson, 1907)
Paralpenus flavicosta (Hampson, 1909)
Paralpenus julius Kühne, 2010
Phryganopsis cinerella (Wallengren, 1860)
Poecilarctia venata Aurivillius, 1921
Popoudina lemniscata (Distant, 1898)
Pseudonaclia puella (Boisduval, 1847)
Radiarctia lutescens (Walker, 1854)
Radiarctia rhodesiana (Hampson, 1900)
Siccia eberti Kühne, 2007
Spilosoma bipartita Rothschild, 1933
Spilosoma gynephaea (Hampson, 1901)
Spilosoma lentifasciata (Hampson, 1916)
Spilosoma sinefascia (Hampson, 1916)
Spilosoma unipuncta (Hampson, 1905)
Teracotona euprepia Hampson, 1900
Teracotona metaxantha Hampson, 1909
Teracotona rhodophaea (Walker, 1865)
Trichaeta pterophorina (Mabille, 1892)
Utetheisa pulchella (Linnaeus, 1758)
Zobida avifex Kühne, 2010

Autostichidae
Autosticha emmetra Meyrick, 1921
Autosticha nothropis Meyrick, 1921

Cecidosidae
Scyrotis matoposensis Mey, 2007

Coleophoridae
Blastobasis indigesta Meyrick, 1931
Blastobasis trachelista Meyrick, 1921
Coleophora molesta Meyrick, 1921
Coleophora phaeocentra Meyrick, 1914
Coleophora purifica Meyrick, 1921

Cosmopterigidae
Alloclita plumbaria (Meyrick, 1921)
Ascalenia phaneracma Meyrick, 1921
Chalcocolona cyananthes (Meyrick, 1911)
Limnaecia explanata Meyrick, 1921
Limnaecia sarcanthes Meyrick, 1921
Macrobathra fasciata (Walsingham, 1891)
Scaeosopha victoriensis Sinev & Li, 2012

Cossidae
Phragmataecia irrorata Hampson, 1910

Crambidae
Agathodes musivalis Guenée, 1854
Ancylolomia albicostalis Hampson, 1919
Ancylolomia perfasciata Hampson, 1919
Calamoschoena stictalis Hampson, 1919
Chilo argyropasta (Hampson, 1919)
Cotachena smaragdina (Butler, 1875)
Crambus brachiiferus Hampson, 1919
Crambus reducta Janse, 1922
Diasemia monostigma Hampson, 1913
Ercta scotialis Hampson, 1912
Euclasta varii Popescu-Gorj & Constantinescu, 1973
Ischnurges lancinalis (Guenée, 1854)
Mesolia uniformella Janse, 1922
Nomophila noctuella ([Denis & Schiffermüller], 1775)
Patissa geminalis Hampson, 1919
Pilocrocis dichocrosialis Hampson, 1912
Pilocrocis melastictalis Hampson, 1912
Pilocrocis pterygodia Hampson, 1912
Prionapteryx flavipars (Hampson, 1919)
Prionapteryx plumbealis (Hampson, 1919)
Pyrausta apicalis (Hampson, 1913)
Pyrausta atricinctalis Hampson, 1913
Pyrausta gazalis Hampson, 1913
Pyrausta tetraplagialis Hampson, 1898

Drepanidae
Aethiopsestis austrina Watson, 1965
Aethiopsestis echinata Watson, 1965
Gonoreta opacifinis Watson, 1965

Elachistidae
Ethmia judicialis Meyrick, 1921
Haplochrois picropa (Meyrick, 1921)
Orophia pachystoma (Meyrick, 1921)

Eriocottidae
Compsoctena delocrossa (Meyrick, 1921)
Compsoctena furciformis (Meyrick, 1921)
Compsoctena isopetra (Meyrick, 1921)
Compsoctena psammosticha (Meyrick, 1921)
Compsoctena quassa (Meyrick, 1921)
Compsoctena scriba (Meyrick, 1921)
Compsoctena spilophanes (Meyrick, 1921)

Eupterotidae
Hibrildes crawshayi Butler, 1896
Hibrildes norax Druce, 1887
Janomima mariana (White, 1843)
Stenoglene obtusus (Walker, 1864)

Gelechiidae
Anarsia agricola Walsingham, 1891
Anarsia balioneura Meyrick, 1921
Anarsia semnopa Meyrick, 1921
Aphnogenes zonaea Meyrick, 1921
Athrips phoenaula (Meyrick, 1913)
Athrips profusa (Meyrick, 1921)
Brachmia hemiopa Meyrick, 1921
Brachmia neurograpta Meyrick, 1921
Coniogyra dilucescens Meyrick, 1921
Curvisignella leucogaea (Meyrick, 1921)
Dichomeris agathopa Meyrick, 1921
Dichomeris aphanopa Meyrick, 1921
Dichomeris attenta Meyrick, 1921
Dichomeris condylodes (Meyrick, 1921)
Dichomeris erixantha (Meyrick, 1914)
Dichomeris eustacta Meyrick, 1921
Dichomeris hylurga Meyrick, 1921
Dichomeris pladarota Meyrick, 1921
Dichomeris xestobyrsa Meyrick, 1921
Dicranucha crateropis (Meyrick, 1921)
Dicranucha nephelopis (Meyrick, 1921)
Ephysteris promptella (Staudinger, 1859)
Epicharta chlorophracta (Meyrick, 1921)
Eporgastis maturata Meyrick, 1921
Eporgastis syngrapta (Meyrick, 1921)
Eporgastis torrescens Meyrick, 1921
Excommatica compsotoma (Meyrick, 1921)
Gelechia xylophaea Meyrick, 1921
Hypatima isosema (Meyrick, 1921)
Lacistodes tauropis Meyrick, 1921
Leuronoma oenochyta (Meyrick, 1921)
Macrocalcara undina (Meyrick, 1921)
Melitoxestis centrotypa Meyrick, 1921
Microcraspedus synecta (Meyrick, 1909)
Neopachnistis autophanta (Meyrick, 1921)
Neopachnistis finitima (Meyrick, 1921)
Neopachnistis microphanta (Meyrick, 1921)
Parallactis ochrobyrsa (Meyrick, 1921)
Parapsectris konradi Bidzilya, 2010
Polyhymno chionarcha Meyrick, 1913
Polyhymno hostilis Meyrick, 1918
Ptilothyris neuroplaca (Meyrick, 1933)
Radionerva collecta (Meyrick, 1921)
Schizovalva sphenopis (Meyrick, 1921)
Stomopteryx bathrarcha Meyrick, 1921
Telphusa accensa Meyrick, 1921
Telphusa objecta Meyrick, 1921
Telphusa syndelta Meyrick, 1921
Trichotaphe asteropis (Meyrick, 1921)
Trichotaphe hercogramma Meyrick, 1921
Trichotaphe homaloxesta Meyrick, 1921

Geometridae
Acanthovalva bilineata (Warren, 1895)
Acanthovalva inconspicuaria (Hübner, 1796)
Androzeugma mollior Prout, 1922
Aphilopota phanerostigma Prout, 1917
Aphilopota plethora Prout, 1938
Ascotis selenaria ([Denis & Schiffermüller], 1775)
Biston stringeri (Prout, 1938)
Cabera aquaemontana (Prout, 1913)
Cabera strigata (Warren, 1897)
Chiasmia abnormata (Prout, 1917)
Chiasmia costicommata (Prout, 1922)
Chiasmia curvifascia (Warren, 1897)
Chiasmia extrusilinea (Prout, 1925)
Chiasmia grisescens (Prout, 1916)
Chiasmia interrupta (Warren, 1897)
Chiasmia kilimanjarensis (Holland, 1892)
Chiasmia marmorata (Warren, 1897)
Chiasmia multistrigata (Warren, 1897)
Chiasmia normata (Walker, 1861)
Chiasmia nubilata (Warren, 1897)
Chiasmia parallacta (Warren, 1897)
Chiasmia procidata (Guenée, 1858)
Chiasmia streniata (Guenée, 1858)
Chiasmia subcurvaria (Mabille, 1897)
Cleora betularia (Warren, 1897)
Cleora munda (Warren, 1899)
Cleora rostella D. S. Fletcher, 1967
Coenina poecilaria (Herrich-Schäffer, 1854)
Colocleora grisea (Janse, 1932)
Colocleora proximaria (Walker, 1860)
Comibaena rhodolopha Prout, 1915
Drepanogynis arcuifera Prout, 1934
Drepanogynis costipicta (Prout, 1932)
Drepanogynis crassifurca Krüger, 2002
Drepanogynis crenilinea Krüger, 2002
Drepanogynis epione (Prout, 1913)
Drepanogynis mixtaria Guenée, 1858
Drepanogynis olivescens (Warren, 1898)
Drepanogynis tripartita (Warren, 1898)
Drepanogynis unilineata (Warren, 1897)
Drepanogynis villaria (Felder & Rogenhofer, 1875)
Epigynopteryx maeviaria (Guenée, 1858)
Erastria leucicolor (Butler, 1875)
Euexia percnopus Prout, 1915
Eulycia grisea (Warren, 1897)
Eupithecia rigida Swinhoe, 1892
Eupithecia semipallida Janse, 1933
Heterorachis insolens (Prout, 1917)
Heterostegane bifasciata (Warren, 1914)
Hypomecis ectropodes (Prout, 1913)
Idaea heres (Prout, 1932)
Idiodes flexilinea (Warren, 1898)
Isoplenodia arabukoensis Sihvonen & Staude, 2010
Isturgia deerraria (Walker, 1861)
Isturgia exospilata (Walker, 1861)
Isturgia spissata (Walker, 1862)
Lomographa indularia (Guenée, 1858)
Mauna electa Prout, 1917
Mauna perquisita Prout, 1922
Menophra caeca (Prout, 1913)
Menophra obtusata (Warren, 1902)
Microligia luteitincta Prout, 1916
Mimandria cataractae Prout, 1917
Mimoclystia pudicata (Walker, 1862)
Neromia clavicornis Prout, 1915
Omphalucha albosignata Janse, 1932
Omphalucha maturnaria (Möschler, 1883)
Oneiliana multifera Prout, 1922
Orbamia octomaculata (Wallengren, 1872)
Orbamia subaurata (Warren, 1899)
Pareclipsis anophthalma Prout, 1916
Phoenicocampa terinata (Felder & Rogenhofer, 1875)
Pingasa distensaria (Walker, 1860)
Pingasa rhadamaria (Guenée, 1858)
Pitthea trifasciata Dewitz, 1881
Plateoplia acrobelia (Wallengren, 1875)
Rhodophthitus commaculata (Warren, 1897)
Rhodophthitus simplex Warren, 1897
Scopula curvimargo (Warren, 1900)
Scopula latitans Prout, 1920
Scopula ludibunda (Prout, 1915)
Somatina ioscia Prout, 1932
Somatina virginalis Prout, 1917
Trimetopia aetheraria Guenée, 1858
Xylopteryx oneili Prout, 1922
Zamarada aclea Prout, 1912
Zamarada ascaphes Prout, 1925
Zamarada bathyscaphes Prout, 1912
Zamarada consecuta Prout, 1922
Zamarada crystallophana Mabille, 1900
Zamarada deceptrix Warren, 1914
Zamarada densisparsa Prout, 1922
Zamarada denticatella Prout, 1922
Zamarada differens Bastelberger, 1907
Zamarada dorsiplaga Prout, 1922
Zamarada eroessa Prout, 1915
Zamarada erugata D. S. Fletcher, 1974
Zamarada fessa Prout, 1912
Zamarada flavicaput Warren, 1901
Zamarada gamma D. S. Fletcher, 1958
Zamarada glareosa Bastelberger, 1909
Zamarada ignicosta Prout, 1912
Zamarada ilma Prout, 1922
Zamarada jansei D. S. Fletcher, 1974
Zamarada melpomene Oberthür, 1912
Zamarada metallicata Warren, 1914
Zamarada metrioscaphes Prout, 1912
Zamarada odontophora D. S. Fletcher, 1974
Zamarada ordinaria Bethune-Baker, 1913
Zamarada plana Bastelberger, 1909
Zamarada polyctemon Prout, 1932
Zamarada pringlei D. S. Fletcher, 1974
Zamarada prionotos D. S. Fletcher, 1974
Zamarada psammites D. S. Fletcher, 1958
Zamarada psectra D. S. Fletcher, 1974
Zamarada pulverosa Warren, 1895
Zamarada purimargo Prout, 1912
Zamarada scintillans Bastelberger, 1909
Zamarada seydeli D. S. Fletcher, 1974
Zamarada transvisaria (Guenée, 1858)
Zamarada varii D. S. Fletcher, 1974
Zamarada vulpina Warren, 1897
Zeuctoboarmia sabinei (Prout, 1915)

Glyphipterigidae
Glyphipterix archimedica Meyrick, 1921

Gracillariidae
Acrocercops chrysophylli Vári, 1961
Acrocercops terminalina Vári, 1961
Apistoneura psarochroma Vári, 1961
Callicercops triceros (Meyrick, 1926)
Caloptilia cataractias (Meyrick, 1921)
Caloptilia isotoma (Meyrick, 1914)
Caloptilia vicinola Vári, 1961
Conopobathra carbunculata (Meyrick, 1912)
Conopobathra gravissima (Meyrick, 1912)
Conopomorpha chionosema Vári, 1961
Conopomorphina gypsochroma Vári, 1961
Dialectica carcharota (Meyrick, 1912)
Diphtheroptila oxyloga (Meyrick, 1928)
Epicephala jansei Vári, 1961
Epicephala pyrrhogastra Meyrick, 1908
Graphiocephala polysticha Vári, 1961
Metriochroa argyrocelis Vári, 1961
Pareclectis prionota (Meyrick, 1928)
Phodoryctis thrypticosema (Vári, 1961)
Phyllocnistis citrella Stainton, 1856
Phyllonorycter grewiaecola (Vári, 1961)
Phyllonorycter hibiscina (Vári, 1961)
Phyllonorycter melanosparta (Meyrick, 1912)
Phyllonorycter melhaniae (Vári, 1961)
Polysoma aenicta Vári, 1961
Polysoma lithochrysa (Meyrick, 1930)
Polysoma tanysphena (Meyrick, 1928)
Porphyrosela teramni Vári, 1961
Spulerina aphanosema Vári, 1961
Stomphastis aphrocyma (Meyrick, 1918)
Stomphastis conflua (Meyrick, 1914)
Stomphastis polygoni Vári, 1961
Stomphastis rorkei Vári, 1961
Stomphastis thraustica (Meyrick, 1908)
Telamoptilia geyeri (Vári, 1961)

Hepialidae
Eudalaca ammon (Wallengren, 1860)

Himantopteridae
Semioptila flavidiscata Hampson, 1910
Semioptila marshalli Rothschild, 1907
Semioptila torta Butler, 1887

Hyblaeidae
Hyblaea occidentalium Holland, 1894
Hyblaea xanthia Hampson, 1910

Lasiocampidae
Anadiasa fuscofasciata (Aurivillius, 1922)
Braura ligniclusa (Walker, 1865)
Catalebeda jamesoni (Bethune-Baker, 1908)
Cleopatrina phocea (Druce, 1887)
Cymatopacha obscura Aurivillius, 1921
Dollmania purpurascens (Aurivillius, 1909)
Epicnapteroides fuliginosa Pinhey, 1973
Epicnapteroides lobata Strand, 1912
Epicnapteroides marmorata Pinhey, 1973
Eutricha morosa (Walker, 1865)
Euwallengrenia rectilineata (Aurivillius, 1905)
Euwallengrenia reducta (Walker, 1855)
Gastropacha africana (Holland, 1893)
Gastroplakaeis meridionalis Aurivillius, 1901
Gonometa robusta (Aurivillius, 1909)
Grellada enigmatica (Hering, 1941)
Grellada marshalli (Aurivillius, 1902)
Haplopacha cinerea Aurivillius, 1905
Hypotrabala sanguicincta (Aurivillius, 1901)
Lechriolepis nephopyropa Tams, 1931
Metajana marshalli Aurivillius, 1909
Odontocheilopteryx dollmani Tams, 1930
Odontocheilopteryx myxa Wallengren, 1860
Odontocheilopteryx obscura Aurivillius, 1927
Odontocheilopteryx pattersoni Tams, 1926
Odontopacha kilwana Strand, 1911
Pallastica meloui (Riel, 1909)
Philotherma obscura Aurivillius, 1927
Pseudolyra cinerea (Aurivillius, 1901)
Pseudometa dollmani Tams, 1925
Pseudometa viola Aurivillius, 1901
Sena donaldsoni (Holland, 1901)
Stenophatna cymographa (Hampson, 1910)
Stenophatna marshalli Aurivillius, 1909
Stenophatna rothschildi (Tams, 1936)
Stoermeriana fusca (Aurivillius, 1905)
Theophasida superba (Aurivillius, 1914)
Trabala charon Druce, 1910
Trichopisthia igneotincta (Aurivillius, 1909)

Lecithoceridae
Dragmatucha proaula Meyrick, 1908
Eridachtha crossogramma (Meyrick, 1921)
Frisilia compsostoma Meyrick, 1921
Odites incusata Meyrick, 1921
Odites metaclista Meyrick, 1915

Limacodidae
Astatophlebia marmarobrunnea Janse, 1964
Crothaema conspicua Janse, 1964
Crothaema sericea Butler, 1880
Gavara lamborni (Bethune-Baker, 1915)
Latoia albicosta (Hampson, 1910)
Latoia viridicosta (Hampson, 1910)
Macroplectra obliquilinea Hampson, 1910
Micraphe lateritia Karsch, 1896
Omocenoides prismallae Janse, 1964
Paraphlebs singularis Aurivillius, 1921
Scotinocerides pseudorestricta Hering, 1937
Stroter dukei Janse, 1964
Taeda aetitis Wallengren, 1863
Trachyptena holobrunnea (Janse, 1964)
Unithosea albilineata (Hampson, 1910)
Zinara discophora Hampson, 1910

Lymantriidae
Aroa achrodisca Hampson, 1910
Aroa quadrimaculata (Janse, 1915)
Chrysocyma mesopotamia Hampson, 1905
Crorema fulvinotata (Butler, 1893)
Dasychira escota Hampson, 1905
Dasychirana crenulata Bethune-Baker, 1911
Euproctis crocosticta Hampson, 1905
Euproctis fulvipennis Hampson, 1910
Euproctis pallida (Kirby, 1896)
Heteronygmia dissimilis Aurivillius, 1910
Laelia aethiopica Bethune-Baker, 1908
Laelia atrifilata (Hampson, 1905)
Laelia marginepunctata Bethune-Baker, 1908
Laelia rubrifilata (Hampson, 1905)
Leptaroa fulvicolora Hampson, 1910
Palasea albimacula Wallengren, 1863
Palasea flavicilia (Hampson, 1910)
Polymona rufifemur Walker, 1855
Pteredoa plumosa Hampson, 1905
Stracena telesilla (Druce, 1899)

Lyonetiidae
Leucoptera loxaula Meyrick, 1928

Metarbelidae
Arbelodes prochesi Lehmann, 2010
Kroonia fumealis (Janse, 1925)
Kroonia natalica (Hampson, 1910)
Marshalliana bivittata Aurivillius, 1901
Metarbela cymaphora Hampson, 1910
Metarbelodes umtaliana (Aurivillius, 1901)

Noctuidae
Achaea catella Guenée, 1852
Achaea echo (Walker, 1858)
Achaea finita (Guenée, 1852)
Achaea lienardi (Boisduval, 1833)
Achaea sordida (Walker, 1865)
Achaea violascens Hampson, 1918
Acontia bidentata (Hampson, 1902)
Acontia chrysoproctis (Hampson, 1902)
Acontia citripennis (Hampson, 1910)
Acontia conifrons (Aurivillius, 1879)
Acontia discoidea Hopffer, 1857
Acontia dispar (Walker, [1858])
Acontia ectorrida (Hampson, 1916)
Acontia gratiosa Wallengren, 1856
Acontia imitatrix Wallengren, 1856
Acontia leucotrigona (Hampson, 1905)
Acontia natalis (Guenée, 1852)
Acontia nephele Hampson, 1911
Acontia niphogona (Hampson, 1909)
Acontia porphyrea (Butler, 1898)
Acontia simo Wallengren, 1860
Acontia tanzaniae Hacker, Legrain & Fibiger, 2010
Acontia transfigurata Wallengren, 1856
Acontia trimaculata Aurivillius, 1879
Acontia trychaenoides Wallengren, 1856
Acontia wahlbergi Wallengren, 1856
Acrapex brunnea Hampson, 1910
Acrapex metaphaea Hampson, 1910
Acrapex spoliata (Walker, 1863)
Adisura aerugo (Felder & Rogenhofer, 1874)
Aegocera tricolora Bethune-Baker, 1909
Agrotis biconica Kollar, 1844
Agrotis isopleura Hampson, 1902
Agrotis longidentifera (Hampson, 1903)
Agrotis segetum ([Denis & Schiffermüller], 1775)
Aletia consanguis (Guenée, 1852)
Amazonides ecstrigata (Hampson, 1903)
Amazonides epipyria (Hampson, 1903)
Amazonides fumicolor (Hampson, 1902)
Amazonides ruficeps (Hampson, 1903)
Amyna axis Guenée, 1852
Amyna punctum (Fabricius, 1794)
Anedhella nigrivittata (Hampson, 1902)
Anoba phaeotermesia Hampson, 1926
Apospasta fuscirufa (Hampson, 1905)
Aspidifrontia glaucescens Hampson, 1905
Aspidifrontia rufescens Hampson, 1902
Aspidifrontia semipallida Hampson, 1902
Athetis chionephra (Hampson, 1911)
Athetis flavipuncta Hampson, 1909
Athetis leuconephra Hampson, 1909
Athetis melanosema Hampson, 1914
Athetis melanosticta Hampson, 1909
Athetis microtera (Hampson, 1902)
Athetis poliostrota Hampson, 1909
Athetis singula (Möschler, 1883)
Audea humeralis Hampson, 1902
Audea tegulata Hampson, 1902
Autoba admota (Felder & Rogenhofer, 1874)
Autoba versicolor Walker, 1864
Axylia annularis Saalmüller, 1891
Brevipecten cornuta Hampson, 1902
Brithys crini (Fabricius, 1775)
Busseola fusca (Fuller, 1901)
Busseola pallidicosta (Hampson, 1902)
Calamia flavirufa Hampson, 1910
Calliodes pretiosissima Holland, 1892
Callopistria maillardi (Guenée, 1862)
Callyna cupricolor Hampson, 1902
Callyna nigerrima Hampson, 1902
Callyna obscura Hampson, 1910
Caradrina atriluna Guenée, 1852
Cerocala contraria (Walker, 1865)
Cerynea thermesialis (Walker, 1866)
Chalciope delta (Boisduval, 1833)
Chasmina tibialis (Fabricius, 1775)
Chlumetia lichenosa (Hampson, 1902)
Chrysodeixis acuta (Walker, [1858])
Copifrontia xantherythra Hampson, 1905
Crameria amabilis (Drury, 1773)
Cretonia ethiopica Hampson, 1910
Ctenoplusia fracta (Walker, 1857)
Ctenoplusia limbirena (Guenée, 1852)
Cyclopera similis (Hampson, 1902)
Cyligramma latona (Cramer, 1775)
Cyligramma magus (Guérin-Méneville, [1844])
Dicerogastra furvilinea (Hampson, 1902)
Dysgonia angularis (Boisduval, 1833)
Dysgonia torrida (Guenée, 1852)
Ectolopha viridescens Hampson, 1902
Egybolis vaillantina (Stoll, 1790)
Entomogramma pardus Guenée, 1852
Erebus walkeri (Butler, 1875)
Ethiopica vinosa (Hampson, 1902)
Eublemma acarodes Swinhoe, 1907
Eublemma apicata Distant, 1898
Eublemma flaviceps Hampson, 1902
Eublemma foedosa (Guenée, 1852)
Eublemma ornatula (Felder & Rogenhofer, 1874)
Eublemma penicillata Hampson, 1902
Eublemma plumbosa Distant, 1899
Eublemma ragusana (Freyer, 1844)
Eublemma staudingeri (Wallengren, 1875)
Eublemma trigramma Hampson, 1910
Eublemma tritonia (Hampson, 1902)
Eulocastra aethiops (Distant, 1898)
Eulymnia pulcherrima (Hampson, 1902)
Eustrotia decissima (Walker, 1865)
Eutelia discitriga Walker, 1865
Eutelia glaucocycla Hampson, 1912
Eutelia polychorda Hampson, 1902
Eutelia symphonica Hampson, 1902
Euterpiodes pienaari (Distant, 1898)
Euxoa pronycta Hampson, 1903
Feliniopsis satellitis (Berio, 1974)
Grammarctia bilinea (Walker, 1865)
Grammodes congenita Walker, 1858
Grammodes geometrica (Fabricius, 1775)
Heliocheilus multiradiata (Hampson, 1902)
Heliothis flavigera (Hampson, 1907)
Heraclia aemulatrix (Westwood, 1881)
Heraclia butleri (Walker, 1869)
Heraclia limbomaculata (Strand, 1909)
Heraclia perdix (Druce, 1887)
Heraclia superba (Butler, 1875)
Honeyia secunda Hacker & Fibiger, 2007
Iambia transversa (Moore, 1882)
Leucania atrinota (Hampson, 1905)
Leucania cupreata (Hampson, 1905)
Leucania melianoides Möschler, 1883
Leucania micropis (Hampson, 1905)
Leucovis alba (Rothschild, 1897)
Lithacodia blandula (Guenée, 1862)
Lophonotidia nocturna Hampson, 1901
Lophoptera methyalea (Hampson, 1902)
Marathyssa cuneata (Saalmüller, 1891)
Masalia galatheae (Wallengren, 1856)
Masalia sublimis (Berio, 1962)
Masalia transvaalica (Distant, 1902)
Matopo inangulata Hampson, 1909
Mesogenea costimacula Hampson, 1926
Micragrotis exusta Hampson, 1903
Micragrotis interstriata (Hampson, 1902)
Micragrotis microstigma Hampson, 1903
Micragrotis prosarca Hampson, 1903
Mimasura tripunctoides Poole, 1989
Mimasura unipuncta (Hampson, 1902)
Mitrophrys menete (Cramer, 1775)
Mocis mayeri (Boisduval, 1833)
Mocis mutuaria (Walker, 1858)
Mythimna poliastis (Hampson, 1902)
Ochrocalama xanthia (Hampson, 1905)
Ochropleura leucogaster (Freyer, 1831)
Odontestra vittigera (Hampson, 1902)
Oederastria ectorhoda Hampson, 1902
Omphalestra mesomelana (Hampson, 1902)
Omphaloceps daria (Druce, 1895)
Ophiusa melaconisia Hampson, 1905
Ophiusa selenaris (Guenée, 1852)
Ophiusa tirhaca (Cramer, 1777)
Oraesia provocans Walker, [1858]
Oruza latifera (Walker, 1869)
Ovios capensis (Herrich-Schäffer, 1854)
Ozarba africana Berio, 1940
Ozarba bipartita (Hampson, 1902)
Ozarba bisexualis Hampson, 1910
Ozarba consanguis (Hampson, 1902)
Ozarba corniculans (Wallengren, 1860)
Ozarba hemimelaena Hampson, 1910
Ozarba hypoxantha (Wallengren, 1860)
Ozarba jansei Berio, 1940
Ozarba metachrysea Hampson, 1910
Ozarba phaea (Hampson, 1902)
Ozarba subterminalis Hampson, 1910
Paratuerta marshalli Hampson, 1902
Pericyma scandulata (Felder & Rogenhofer, 1874)
Phaegorista xanthosoma Hampson, 1910
Phalerodes cauta (Hampson, 1902)
Plecoptera melanoscia Hampson, 1926
Plecopterodes melliflua (Holland, 1897)
Plecopterodes moderata (Wallengren, 1860)
Polia cuprescens Hampson, 1905
Polydesma sagulata Wallengren, 1875
Polydesma umbricola Boisduval, 1833
Procrateria noloides Hampson, 1905
Pseudospiris paidiformis Butler, 1895
Pseudozarba opella (Swinhoe, 1885)
Ramesodes micropis Hampson, 1910
Rhynchina coniodes Vári, 1962
Saalmuellerana media (Walker, 1857)
Schausia langazana Kiriakoff, 1974
Selenistis annulella (Hampson, 1902)
Sesamia albivena Hampson, 1902
Sesamia calamistis Hampson, 1910
Sesamia coniota Hampson, 1902
Sesamia taenioleuca (Wallengren, 1866)
Soloe fumipennis Hampson, 1910
Spirama glaucescens (Butler, 1893)
Spirama griseisigna (Hampson, 1913)
Spodoptera cilium Guenée, 1852
Spodoptera exempta (Walker, 1857)
Spodoptera littoralis (Boisduval, 1833)
Spodoptera mauritia (Boisduval, 1833)
Tanocryx pinheyi Viette, 1973
Thiacidas cookei (Pinhey, 1958)
Thiacidas dukei (Pinhey, 1968)
Thiacidas fasciata (Fawcett, 1917)
Thiacidas fractilinea (Pinhey, 1968)
Thiacidas nigrimacula (Pinhey, 1968)
Thiacidas postalbida (Gaede, 1939)
Thiacidas roseotincta (Pinhey, 1962)
Thyatirina achatina (Weymer, 1896)
Thysanoplusia indicator (Walker, [1858])
Timora daphoena Hampson, 1910
Tracheplexia lucia (Felder & Rogenhofer, 1974)
Trichoplusia orichalcea (Fabricius, 1775)
Tumidifrontia castaneotincta Hampson, 1902
Tytroca balnearia (Distant, 1898)
Ulotrichopus leucopasta Hampson, 1913
Ulotrichopus tinctipennis (Hampson, 1902)
Uncula tristigmatias (Hampson, 1902)
Vietteania torrentium (Guenée, 1852)
Vittaplusia vittata (Wallengren, 1856)
Zalaca snelleni (Wallengren, 1875)

Nolidae
Arcyophora longivalvis Guenée, 1852
Arcyophora patricula (Hampson, 1902)
Chlorozada verna (Hampson, 1902)
Earias insulana (Boisduval, 1833)
Maurilia arcuata (Walker, [1858])
Meganola infuscata (Hampson, 1903)
Megathripa rufimedia (Hampson, 1905)
Neaxestis griseata Hampson, 1902
Neaxestis rhoda Hampson, 1905
Negeta luminosa (Walker, 1858)
Negeta nivea (Hampson, 1902)
Nola argyrolepis Hampson, 1907
Nola foviferoides Poole, 1989
Nola imitata (van Son, 1933)
Nola major Hampson, 1891
Nola melanoscelis (Hampson, 1914)
Nola phaeocraspis (Hampson, 1909)
Nola socotrensis (Hampson, 1901)
Paranola bipartita van Son, 1933
Pardoxia graellsii (Feisthamel, 1837)
Xanthodes brunnescens (Pinhey, 1968)

Notodontidae
Afrocerura leonensis (Hampson, 1910)
Afroplitis phyllocampa (Trimen, 1909)
Antheua aurifodinae (Distant, 1902)
Antheua croceipuncta Hampson, 1910
Antheua delicata Bethune-Baker, 1911
Antheua encausta (Hampson, 1910)
Antheua trimacula Kiriakoff, 1954
Archistilbia cineracea Kiriakoff, 1954
Archistilbia varii Kiriakoff, 1970
Atrasana callitoxa (Tams, 1930)
Atrasana grisea (Gaede, 1928)
Atrasana pinheyi Kiriakoff, 1962
Bisolita rubrifascia (Hampson, 1910)
Catastygne tristicolor (Gaede, 1928)
Cerurina marshalli (Hampson, 1910)
Chlorocalliope calliope (Hampson, 1910)
Chlorochadisra beltista (Tams, 1930)
Clostera distinguenda Kiriakoff, 1962
Clostera ferruginosa (Gaede, 1934)
Clostera formosa Kiriakoff, 1962
Clostera nubila Kiriakoff, 1962
Clostera semilunata Kiriakoff, 1971
Deinarchia agramma (Hampson, 1910)
Desmeocraera analis Kiriakoff, 1954
Desmeocraera basalis Distant, 1899
Desmeocraera canescens Janse, 1920
Desmeocraera decorata (Wichgraf, 1922)
Desmeocraera interpellatrix (Wallengren, 1860)
Desmeocraera latex (Druce, 1901)
Desmeocraera luteosticta Kiriakoff, 1968
Desmeocraera oliva Kiriakoff, 1968
Desmeocraera venusta Kiriakoff, 1954
Desmeocraera vernalis Distant, 1897
Drapetides uniformis (Swinhoe, 1907)
Elaphrodes lactea (Gaede, 1932)
Epicerura steniptera (Hampson, 1910)
Eubreyeria dasychiroides (Janse, 1920)
Eujansea afra (Bethune-Baker, 1911)
Galona serena Karsch, 1895
Hampsonita esmeralda (Hampson, 1910)
Helga infans Kiriakoff, 1962
Heraia thalassina (Hampson, 1910)
Induba nigrescens Kiriakoff, 1955
Leptolepida rhodesiae Kiriakoff, 1965
Leucophalera latipennis (Butler, 1897)
Metopteryx cinerea (Janse, 1920)
Metopteryx infans (Kiriakoff, 1964)
Notocerura spiritalis (Distant, 1899)
Notoxantha sesamiodes Hampson, 1910
Paradrallia rhodesi Bethune-Baker, 1908
Pararethona hierax (Distant, 1897)
Parastaura divisa Gaede, 1928
Phalera imitata Druce, 1896
Phycitimorpha congruata Janse, 1920
Phycitimorpha stigmatica Janse, 1920
Plastystaura glis Kiriakoff, 1968
Plastystaura murina Kiriakoff, 1965
Polelassothys plumitarsus Janse, 1920
Polienus capillata (Wallengren, 1875)
Polienus fuscatus Janse, 1920
Polienus nigrosparsa Janse, 1920
Psalisodes dimorpha Kiriakoff, 1968
Pseudorethona albicans (Walker, 1855)
Quista albicostata (Hampson, 1910)
Rasemia macrodonta (Hampson, 1909)
Rheneina buceros Kiriakoff, 1971
Rosinella rosinaria (Hampson, 1910)
Sarimarais bicolor (Distant, 1899)
Sarimarais pinheyi Kiriakoff, 1962
Scrancia danieli Kiriakoff, 1962
Scrancia elanus Kiriakoff, 1971
Scrancia galactoperoides Kiriakoff, 1970
Scrancia milvus Kiriakoff, 1971
Scrancia stictica Hampson, 1910
Scrancia subscrancia Kiriakoff, 1970
Stenostaura rhodesiae (Kiriakoff, 1965)
Tricholoba glaphira (Kiriakoff, 1955)
Trotonotus bettoni Butler, 1898
Turnacoides basipuncta Gaede, 1928

Oecophoridae
Erotis hesperanthes Meyrick, 1921
Fabiola callipetala Meyrick, 1921
Ocyphron oxyphylla Meyrick, 1921
Plesiosticha galactaea (Meyrick, 1908)
Promalactis geometrica Meyrick, 1913
Stathmopoda revincta Meyrick, 1921

Opostegidae
Opostega orophoxantha Meyrick, 1921

Plutellidae
Plutella xylostella (Linnaeus, 1758)

Psychidae
Ctenocompa halophanta Meyrick, 1921
Narycia copiosa Meyrick, 1921
Narycia prothyrodes Meyrick, 1921
Picrospora invia (Meyrick, 1921)
Picrospora monoplecta (Meyrick, 1921)

Pterophoridae
Hepalastis pumilio (Zeller, 1873)
Macrotinactis stenodactylus (D. S. Fletcher, 1911)
Marasmarcha sisyrodes Meyrick, 1921
Platyptilia locharcha Meyrick, 1924
Pterophorus albidus (Zeller, 1852)
Stenodacma wahlbergi (Zeller, 1852)

Pyralidae
Aglossodes prionophoralis Ragonot, 1891
Aphomia pimelodes Meyrick, 1936
Calamotropodes grisella Janse, 1922
Commotria albistria Janse, 1922
Commotria ruficolor Janse, 1922
Delopterus basalis Janse, 1922
Epilepia melanobasis (Hampson, 1906)
Epilepia melanobrunnea (Janse, 1922)
Epilepia melanosparsalis (Janse, 1922)
Epilepia melapastalis (Hampson, 1906)
Hypsopygia mauritialis (Boisduval, 1833)
Lamoria exiguata Whalley, 1964
Lamoria imbella (Walker, 1864)
Lamoria medianalis Hampson, 1917
Macalla cupreotincta Janse, 1922
Mesodiphlebia rhodesiana Janse, 1922
Parematheudes simplex (Janse, 1922)
Pempelia morosalis (Saalmüller, 1880)
Poliostola phycitimorpha Janse, 1922
Pyralis galactalis Hampson, 1916
Rhinaphe lutosa Janse, 1922

Saturniidae
Adafroptilum incana (Sonthonnax, 1899)
Antistathmoptera daltonae Tams, 1935
Antistathmoptera rectangulata Pinhey, 1968
Argema mimosae (Boisduval, 1847)
Athletes gigas (Sonthonnax, 1902)
Athletes semialba (Sonthonnax, 1904)
Aurivillius arata (Westwood, 1849)
Bunaeopsis bomfordi Pinhey, 1962
Bunaeopsis hersilia (Westwood, 1849)
Bunaeopsis jacksoni (Jordan, 1908)
Bunaeopsis oubie (Guérin-Méneville, 1849)
Bunaeopsis princeps (Le Cerf, 1918)
Bunaeopsis vau (Fawcett, 1915)
Campimoptilum kuntzei (Dewitz, 1881)
Cinabra hyperbius (Westwood, 1881)
Cinabra kitalei Bouvier, 1930
Cirina forda (Westwood, 1849)
Decachorda aspersa (Felder, 1874)
Decachorda fulvia (Druce, 1886)
Decachorda pomona (Weymer, 1892)
Decachorda rosea Aurivillius, 1898
Epiphora bauhiniae (Guérin-Méneville, 1832)
Epiphora mythimnia (Westwood, 1849)
Gonimbrasia affinis (Bouvier, 1926)
Gonimbrasia tyrrhea (Cramer, 1775)
Gonimbrasia zambesina (Walker, 1865)
Gynanisa ata Strand, 1911
Gynanisa maja (Klug, 1836)
Gynanisa zimba Darge, 2008
Heniocha apollonia (Cramer, 1779)
Heniocha marnois (Rogenhofer, 1891)
Holocerina agomensis (Karsch, 1896)
Holocerina angulata (Aurivillius, 1893)
Holocerina rhodesiensis (Janse, 1918)
Holocerina smilax (Westwood, 1849)
Imbrasia ertli Rebel, 1904
Lobobunaea angasana (Westwood, 1849)
Lobobunaea phaedusa (Drury, 1782)
Ludia delegorguei (Boisduval, 1847)
Ludia orinoptena Karsch, 1892
Micragone ansorgei (Rothschild, 1907)
Nudaurelia carnegiei Janse, 1918
Nudaurelia gueinzii (Staudinger, 1872)
Nudaurelia macrops Rebel, 1917
Nudaurelia macrothyris (Rothschild, 1906)
Orthogonioptilum adiegetum Karsch, 1892
Pseudaphelia apollinaris (Boisduval, 1847)
Pseudimbrasia deyrollei (J. Thomson, 1858)
Pseudobunaea irius (Fabricius, 1793)
Pseudobunaea tyrrhena (Westwood, 1849)
Rohaniella pygmaea (Maassen & Weymer, 1885)
Tagoropsis hanningtoni (Butler, 1883)
Urota conjuncta Bouvier, 1930
Usta terpsichore (Maassen & Weymer, 1885)

Sesiidae
Chamanthedon xanthopasta Hampson, 1919
Echidgnathia vitrifasciata (Hampson, 1910)
Episannina melanochalcia Le Cerf, 1917
Erismatica erythropis Meyrick, 1933
Homogyna sanguicosta Hampson, 1919
Melittia lentistriata Hampson, 1919
Melittia oedipus Oberthür, 1878
Paranthrene xanthosoma (Hampson, 1910)
Tipulamima sophax (Druce, 1899)
Vespaegeria typica Strand, 1913

Sphingidae
Afroclanis calcareus (Rothschild & Jordan, 1907)
Afroclanis neavi (Hampson, 1910)
Antinephele lunulata Rothschild & Jordan, 1903
Antinephele maculifera Holland, 1889
Basiothia aureata (Karsch, 1891)
Basiothia schenki (Möschler, 1872)
Falcatula falcata (Rothschild & Jordan, 1903)
Hippotion roseipennis (Butler, 1882)
Hippotion stigma (Rothschild & Jordan, 1903)
Leptoclanis pulchra Rothschild & Jordan, 1903
Likoma apicalis Rothschild & Jordan, 1903
Litosphingia corticea Jordan, 1920
Neoclanis basalis (Walker, 1866)
Neopolyptychus compar (Rothschild & Jordan, 1903)
Nephele lannini Jordan, 1926
Nephele rosae Butler, 1875
Odontosida magnificum (Rothschild, 1894)
Pantophaea oneili (Clark, 1925)
Phylloxiphia metria (Jordan, 1920)
Phylloxiphia punctum (Rothschild, 1907)
Phylloxiphia vicina (Rothschild & Jordan, 1915)
Platysphinx piabilis (Distant, 1897)
Polyptychoides grayii (Walker, 1856)
Polyptychopsis marshalli (Rothschild & Jordan, 1903)
Polyptychus baxteri Rothschild & Jordan, 1908
Polyptychus coryndoni Rothschild & Jordan, 1903
Praedora marshalli Rothschild & Jordan, 1903
Praedora plagiata Rothschild & Jordan, 1903
Pseudoclanis molitor (Rothschild & Jordan, 1912)
Rhodafra marshalli Rothschild & Jordan, 1903
Rufoclanis fulgurans (Rothschild & Jordan, 1903)
Rufoclanis jansei (Vári, 1964)
Rufoclanis numosae (Wallengren, 1860)
Temnora elegans (Rothschild, 1895)
Temnora funebris (Holland, 1893)
Temnora iapygoides (Holland, 1889)
Temnora natalis Walker, 1856
Temnora pseudopylas (Rothschild, 1894)
Temnora pylades Rothschild & Jordan, 1903
Temnora pylas (Cramer, 1779)
Temnora sardanus (Walker, 1856)
Temnora subapicalis Rothschild & Jordan, 1903
Temnora swynnertoni Stevenson, 1938
Temnora zantus (Herrich-Schäffer, 1854)
Theretra cajus (Cramer, 1777)
Xenosphingia jansei Jordan, 1920

Thyrididae
Arniocera cyanoxantha (Mabille, 1893)
Arniocera erythropyga (Wallengren, 1860)
Arniocera zambesina (Walker, 1866)
Bupota tranquilla Whalley, 1971
Dilophura caudata (Jordan, 1907)
Dysodia constellata Warren, 1908
Dysodia fenestratella Warren, 1900
Dysodia fumida Whalley, 1968
Dysodia incognita Whalley, 1968
Dysodia intermedia (Walker, 1865)
Dysodia subsignata Warren, 1908
Dysodia vitrina (Boisduval, 1829)
Epaena danista Whalley, 1971
Lamprochrysa scintillans (Butler, 1893)
Lamprochrysa triplex (Plötz, 1880)
Rhodoneura flavicilia Hampson, 1906
Rhodoneura lacunosa Whalley, 1971

Tineidae
Acridotarsa melipecta (Meyrick, 1915)
Amphixystis anachoreta (Meyrick, 1921)
Amphixystis cymataula (Meyrick, 1926)
Antigambra amphitrocta Meyrick, 1927
Ateliotum reluctans (Meyrick, 1921)
Ceratophaga ethadopa (Meyrick, 1938)
Ceratophaga lichmodes (Meyrick, 1921)
Ceratophaga vastellus (Zeller, 1852)
Cimitra fetialis (Meyrick, 1917)
Cimitra horridella (Walker, 1863)
Crypsithyris cerodectis Meyrick, 1921
Crypsithyris hemiphracta Meyrick, 1926
Cylicobathra argocoma (Meyrick, 1914)
Cylicobathra chionarga Meyrick, 1920
Dasyses obliterata Gozmány, 1968
Drosica abjectella Walker, 1963
Edosa audens (Meyrick, 1921)
Edosa leucastis (Meyrick, 1908)
Edosa rhodesica (Gozmány, 1967)
Hapsifera glebata Meyrick, 1908
Hapsifera marmarota Meyrick, 1914
Hapsifera ochroptila Meyrick, 1908
Hapsifera septica Meyrick, 1908
Hapsiferona glareosa (Meyrick, 1912)
Hyperbola mellichroa (Gozmány, 1968)
Hyperbola phocina (Meyrick, 1908)
Miarotagmata penetrata (Meyrick, 1911)
Monopis megalodelta Meyrick, 1908
Monopis persimilis Gozmány, 1965
Perissomastix christinae Gozmány, 1965
Perissomastix dentifera Gozmány & Vári, 1973
Perissomastix fulvicoma (Meyrick, 1921)
Perissomastix mili Gozmány, 1965
Perissomastix mucrapex Gozmány, 1968
Perissomastix perlata Gozmány, 1967
Perissomastix recurvata Gozmány, 1968
Phaeoses lithacma (Meyrick, 1921)
Pitharcha chalinaea Meyrick, 1908
Silosca savannae Gozmány, 1968
Sphallestasis exarata (Gozmány, 1968)
Sphallestasis oenopis (Meyrick, 1908)
Sphallestasis spatulata (Gozmány, 1967)
Sphallestasis tanystis (Meyrick, 1908)
Tinea subalbidella Stainton, 1867
Tinea translucens Meyrick, 1917
Tineola bisselliella (Hummel, 1823)

Tischeriidae
Coptotriche basipectinella Puplesis & Diskus, 2003
Coptotriche zimbabwiensis Puplesis & Diskus, 2003
Tischeria sparmanniae Puplesis & Diškus, 2003

Tortricidae
Bactra aciculata Diakonoff, 1963
Bactra legitima Meyrick, 1911
Bactra punctistrigana Mabille, 1900
Bactra pythonia Meyrick, 1909
Bactra stagnicolana Zeller, 1852
Brachioxena psammacta (Meyrick, 1908)
Cornesia ormoperla Razowski, 1981
Cydia campestris (Meyrick, 1914)
Cydia cyanocephala (Meyrick, 1921)
Cydia leucatma (Meyrick, 1925)
Cydia malesana (Meyrick, 1920)
Cydia nicomacha (Meyrick, 1921)
Cydia stelocosma (Meyrick, 1925)
Dasodis rimosa (Meyrick, 1921)
Doliochastis homograpta Meyrick, 1920
Eccopsis incultana (Walker, 1863)
Epichoristodes acerbella (Walker, 1864)
Eucosma florescens Meyrick, 1925
Eucosma gomphacma Meyrick, 1928
Eucosma habrotoma Meyrick, 1934
Eucosmocydia antidora (Meyrick, 1921)
Homona polyarcha Meyrick, 1924
Leguminovora ptychora (Meyrick, 1907)
Megalota lobotona (Meyrick, 1921)
Mesotes chromataspis (Meyrick, 1921)
Metendothenia balanacma (Meyrick, 1914)
Olethreutes mochlaspis (Meyrick, 1921)
Olethreutes transformis (Meyrick, 1921)
Olethreutes trithyra (Meyrick, 1921)
Paraeccopsis acroplecta (Meyrick, 1921)
Paraeccopsis exhilarata (Meyrick, 1918)
Rufeccopsis brunneograpta Razowski, 2008
Rufeccopsis rufescens (Meyrick, 1913)
Stenentoma plectocosma (Meyrick, 1921)
Thaumatotibia batrachopa (Meyrick, 1908)
Tortrix praeclinata Meyrick, 1921

Uraniidae
Leucoplema dohertyi (Warren, 1904)

Xyloryctidae
Scythris distactica Meyrick, 1921
Scythris halmyrodes Meyrick, 1921
Scythris homoxantha Meyrick, 1921
Scythris ilyopa Meyrick, 1921
Scythris patiens Meyrick, 1921

Yponomeutidae
Prays citri (Millière, 1873)
Yponomeuta octocentra Meyrick, 1921

Zygaenidae
Astyloneura glennia (Jordan, 1907)
Epiorna ochreipennis (Butler, 1874)
Malamblia flavipalpis Hampson, 1910

References

External links 

Moths
Zimbabwe
Zimbabwe